Walter Freitag may refer to:
 Walter Freitag (cyclist)
 Walter Freitag (politician)